The Shimanek Bridge is a covered bridge near Scio in Linn County in the U.S. state of Oregon.  It was added to the National Register of Historic Places as Thomas Creek – Shimanek Covered Bridge in 1987.

Replacing a similar structure severely damaged by the Columbus Day Storm of 1962, it is the fifth bridge at this location. The fourth bridge had been built in 1927, and the first is thought to have dated to 1861.

It is the longest covered bridge in Linn County and the newest. A county crew renovated the structure in 2002, repairing damage caused by a flood in 1996.

In November 2015, the bridge was closed for repairs after an inspection revealed "serious decay". Temporary repairs were expected to take weeks. More substantial repairs may not occur for up to two years, depending on funding.

The bridge in under repair in Spring of 2022.

See also
 List of bridges on the National Register of Historic Places in Oregon
 List of Oregon covered bridges

References

External links

Bridges completed in 1966
Covered bridges on the National Register of Historic Places in Oregon
Bridges in Linn County, Oregon
Wooden bridges in Oregon
Tourist attractions in Linn County, Oregon
National Register of Historic Places in Linn County, Oregon
Road bridges on the National Register of Historic Places in Oregon
Howe truss bridges in the United States